The Ribble Valley by-election, in Lancashire, England, took place on 7 March 1991 following the elevation of MP David Waddington to the House of Lords. Michael Carr of the Liberal Democrats won election at his third attempt.

The seat, based largely on the market town of Clitheroe, had previously been safely Conservative but at the time the controversial Margaret Thatcher's "Poll Tax" policy was used by opposition parties against the Conservative candidate. The tax was abolished soon afterwards by Thatcher's successor John Major, who had succeeded Thatcher on her resignation in November 1990.

The then-young Liberal Democrats maintained the record of their parent parties at often scoring by-election "scalps" by winning apparently-safe seats, although rarely holding them at subsequent general elections. Indeed, despite their victory at Ribble Valley, the Lib Dems lost the seat a little over a year later at the 1992 general election to the Conservative Nigel Evans who has held the seat ever since.

Result

Previous results

See also
Lists of United Kingdom by-elections
List of parliamentary constituencies in Lancashire

References

External links
British Parliamentary By Elections: Campaign literature from the by-election

Politics of Ribble Valley
Clitheroe
1991 elections in the United Kingdom
1991 in England
1990s in Lancashire
By-elections to the Parliament of the United Kingdom in Lancashire constituencies